Royal Alexander Brink (16 September 1897 – 2 October 1984), also known as R. A. Brink, was a Canadian-born plant geneticist and plant breeder at the University of Wisconsin–Madison.

Professional background 
Brink was instrumental to the beginning of the Wisconsin maize breeding program during the 1920s. He also served as chair of the Department of Genetics at the University of Wisconsin–Madison from 1939 through 1951.

His scientific achievements include the discovery of paramutation in maize and the study of transposons. Brink was also very interested in agriculture, creating new varieties of clover and alfalfa during his career.

Brink was awarded many honors during his lifetime. He was elected to the National Academy of Sciences in 1947. He was also an editor of the Genetics Society of America's journal, Genetics, from 1952 through 1957 and served as president of the society in 1957.

Brink is the subject of a posthumous biographical memoir by his fellow geneticists Oliver E. Nelson, Jr., and Ray D. Owen and published by the National Academy of Sciences.

Brink was doctoral advisor to Esther Lederberg, a pioneer in bacterial genetics and molecular genetics.

References

External links
National Academy of Sciences Biographical Memoir

1897 births
1984 deaths
Canadian geneticists
University of Illinois Urbana-Champaign alumni
University of Wisconsin–Madison faculty
Canadian emigrants to the United States
Members of the United States National Academy of Sciences
Genetics (journal) editors